Chachoengsao may refer to
the town Chachoengsao
Chachoengsao Province
Mueang Chachoengsao district